Mud Boy and the Neutrons was a Memphis rock music band who influenced the Memphis alternative rock scene from the 1970s to the 1990s.

They released three albums on labels like New Rose Records (France) and Koch International. The group featured Jim Dickinson on keyboards, vocals and guitar, Sid Selvidge on acoustic guitar and vocals, Lee Baker on electric guitar, and Jimmy Crosthwait on washboard. Baker, who made a guest appearance on Big Star's Third/Sister Lovers album and led his own Lee Baker & The Agitators group, died on September 10, 1996. At that time Mud Boy and the Neutrons temporarily disbanded, but reformed in 2005 to perform at a festival of Memphis music held at The Barbican in London. This concert was filmed but to date remains unreleased.

The group has always been known for deliberately making their offbeat public performances rare, special events; they never toured. Their music style included elements of varying Southern United States-oriented music styles including blues, "swamp" music, R&B, folk music, gospel music, and country.

Tav Falco's Panther Burns and others from the area were inspired by the band. Two sons of Dickinson (Luther and Cody), influenced by the group, formed the North Mississippi Allstars with other musicians in the 1990s; Selvidge's son Steve founded a group called Big Ass Truck in the same period.

Dickinson died on August 15, 2009. Sid Selvidge died from cancer on May 2, 2013, at the age of 69 (he was born Jul 21, 1943).

Discography
 Known Felons in Drag (1986)
 Negro Streets at Dawn (1993)
 They Walk Among Us (1995)

Compilations

 Play New Rose For Me (1987)
 It Came From Memphis, Volume 1 (1995)
 It Came From Memphis, Volume 2 (2001)
 On Air: Live Music From The WEVL Archives (1996)

References

 Ankeny, Jason. [ "Jim Dickinson Biography."] Allmusic. Retrieved Apr. 26, 2005.
 Gordon, Robert (1995). It Came From Memphis. New York: Pocket Books. .
 ___. (1996). "Lee Baker" (obituary). Living Blues #130: 49.
 Hoppula, Pete (1998–2005). "Jim Dickinson." Wang Dang Dula!" Retrieved Apr. 26, 2005.
 "Ardent Studios – Sun 3 Apr – 7.30pm." It Came From Memphis event webpage. Retrieved Apr. 26, 2005.
 Koda, Cub. [ "They Walk Among Us."] Allmusic. Retrieved Apr. 26, 2005.
 Shaw, Norm (October 1996). "Lee Baker: 1944 to 1996." BlueSpeak. Retrieved Apr. 26, 2005.
 Wirz, Stefan. "Sid Selvidge Discography."  American Music''. Retrieved Apr. 26, 2005.
 De Winter, Maxim. "It Came From Memphis - blog." 
 "Lee Baker & The Agitators - Icehouse Records" Retrieved Sept. 18, 2005.
 "Jim Dickinson: Compilations" Retrieved Sept. 18, 2005
 Koch, Stephen. "The Unknown Supergroup." Arkansas Times. Last updated Sept. 21, 2006

External links
 Illustrated Sid Selvidge discography

Mud Boy and the Neutrons
Musical groups from Memphis, Tennessee